Vampi King may refer to:
Vampire Evil King, a boss in Okage
Count Dracula, called the Vampire King in the novel Dracula by Bram Stoker as well as the Vampire Hunter D series
Alucard (Hellsing), depicted as Count Dracula in the Hellsing series
Playboi Carti, a rapper who uses the moniker King Vamp and has a song of the same name